The Drighiu is a left tributary of the river Valea Mare in Romania. It flows into the Valea Mare near Bozieș.

References

Rivers of Romania
Rivers of Sălaj County